Gabriela Rodríguez (born 12 December 1996) is a Mexican sport shooter. She qualified to represent Mexico at the 2020 Summer Olympics in Tokyo 2021, competing in women's skeet.

Her father, Javier, competed in shooting at the 2012 Summer Olympics.

References

 

1996 births
Living people
Mexican female sport shooters
Shooters at the 2020 Summer Olympics
Olympic shooters of Mexico
Pan American Games competitors for Mexico
Shooters at the 2019 Pan American Games
Sportspeople from Monterrey